The Middlesex RFU Senior Bowl is an annual rugby union knock-out club competition organised by the Middlesex Rugby Football Union.  It was first introduced during the 2003–04 season, with the inaugural winners being Hammersmith & Fulham.  It is the second most important cup competition organised by the Middlesex RFU, behind the Senior Cup but ahead of the Senior Vase. 

The Senior Bowl is currently open to the next top 16 club sides that are not eligible for the senior cup based in the historic county of Middlesex (2016–17 only saw 6 clubs take part), typically playing between tiers 6–9 of the English rugby union league system.  The format is a knockout cup with a first round, semi-finals and a final to be held at one of the finalist's home ground between March–June (although final dates can vary drastically).

Middlesex Senior Bowl winners

Number of wins
Finchley (3)
Grasshoppers (3)
Chiswick (2)
Hammersmith & Fulham (2)
Enfield Ignatians (1)
Old Actonians (1)
Old Priorians (1)
Teddington (1)
Twickenham (1)

Notes

See also
 Middlesex RFU
 Middlesex Senior Cup
 Middlesex Senior Vase
 English rugby union system
 Rugby union in England

References

External links
 Middlesex RFU

Recurring sporting events established in 2003
2003 establishments in England
Rugby union cup competitions in England
Sport in London
Rugby union in Middlesex